Georgian cuisine consists of cooking traditions, techniques, and practices of Georgia. Georgian cuisine has a distinct character, while bearing some similarities with various national cuisines of the Caucasus and the wider Eastern Europe. Every region of Georgia has its own distinct style of food preparation. Eating and drinking are important parts of Georgian culture.

Georgia was one of the countries on the Silk Road, which resulted in travelers influencing Georgian cuisine. Supra is offered spontaneously to relatives, friends or guests. Every  has its  (toastmaster), who gives the toast and entertains the guests.

In 2010 Georgian cuisine was described as having had an exotic appeal to Russians that The Independent compared to that of Indian cuisine to the British.

Regional traditional cuisines

Abkhazia
Abkhazian cuisine uses many spices and walnuts. 
 The most popular dishes from Abkhazia are Abysta (Абыста - porridge made of corn, similar to the Mingrelian Ghomi), Apyrpylchapa (Апырпылчапа - pepper skin stuffed with walnut sauce), Achma (Ачма - a variation of Khachapuri), Aritsvmgeli (Арицвмгели - corn bread with walnut), Achash (Ачаш - Abkhaz chudu, with cheese), Achapa (Ачапа - kidney beans with walnut) and Akutaghchapa (Акутагьчапа - hard boiled eggs filled with walnuts, similar to deviled eggs).
 The most popular dessert is Akuarkuar, a cookie with honey.
 Ajika is a hot, spicy, but subtly flavored dip, often used to flavor food. Ajika is also sold as a dry spice blend. 
 Abkhazian wines include Lykhny, Apsny, and Anakopia.

Adjara
Adjarian cuisine is considered a very diversified cuisine, which has been influenced by its geography (seaside, mountainous part) and by its history.
 In the mountainous Adjara, the main products are dairy products and the dishes are more fat and heavy and on the other side, in the seaside of the region, dishes are mostly spiced, and use many fresh herbs.
 The most popular dishes in Adjara are Adjaruli Khachapuri, Borano ( - chopped cheese fried in ghee), Chirbuli ( - omelette with walnuts and tomato), Malakhto ( - mashed kidney beans with walnuts and crude grape juice), Iakhni  ( - stew similar to Kharcho, traditionally made in and around Kobuleti) Khavitsi ( - porridge of corn with ghee), Sinori ( - made of Nadughi and unleavened dough), Pakhlava ( - a version of the Turkish Baklava) and Shaqarlama ( - a biscuit).

Guria
The cuisine of Guria is based mostly on poultry (especially chicken meat), corn-bread (Mchadi) and on walnuts, like the cuisine of Imereti.
 The most popular dishes from Guria are Satsivi ( - meat, mostly of chicken/turkey in walnut sauce called bazhe), Mchadi ( - Cornbread), Kupati ( - sausage made from pork meat), Badrijani Nigvzit ( - fried eggplant with walnut sauce), Gurian Ghvezeli ( - crescent shaped kind of khachapuri filled with cheese and hard boiled egg which is usually eaten on Christmas Day), Brinjula ( - a sort of cheese omelette "with a dough base" similar to khachapuri) Pkhali and Kuchmachi ( - Beef or poultry livers with walnut sauce and pomegranate).

Imereti
The cuisine of Imereti shares many affinities with the neighbouring region of Guria and is known for its plentiful use of  walnuts.
 The most famous Imeretian dishes include Imeruli Khachapuri ( - the most common version of the Georgian cheese bread), Mchadi ( - Cornbread), Pkhali, Kuchmachi ( - beef or poultry livers with walnut sauce and pomegranate), Soko ( - fried mushrooms), Lobio ( - mashed red beans with spices), Badrijani Nigvzit ( - fried eggplant with walnut sauce), Chakhokhbili ( - tomato-based soup with poultry meat), Mtsnili ( - pickled vegetables such as cucumbers, cabbage, beets, and jonjoli), Ekala ( - pkhali made from smilax)Kupati ( - pork sausage), Satsivi ( - meat, mostly of chicken/turkey in walnut sauce called bazhe), and Tsitsila Isrim-Maqvalshi ( - roasted chick in a blackberry and grape based sauce)
 Imereti is also famous for its cheeses such as Chkinti ( - Salty cheese), Imeruli Kveli and also Sulguni.

Kakheti
Kakhetian cuisine is considered to be a more meat-based cuisine and the region itself is called the "Region of Wine". It is also known as the birth-place of one type of Georgian bread, Tonis Puri. 
 Notable dishes from Kakheti include Mtsvadi ( - meat cooked on fire), Chakapuli ( - soup made of fresh herbs such as tarragon and meat of sheep or lamb), Khinkali ( - dumplings filled with meat and seasoned with herbs), Khashlama ( - boiled meat of beef or lamb), Khashi ( - boiled meat, often eaten after Supra), Chanakhi ( - soup made of lamb and tomatoes), Chikhirtma ( - soup made of chicken meat), and Ajapsandali ( - kind of ragout made of eggplants, potatoes and tomatoes).
 In Kakheti, they make famous desserts such as Churchkhela ( - Candy made of grape juice and walnuts), and Pelamushi ( - Dessert made of grape juice).
 Kakheti is also well known for its wines, with wine growing regions such as the Alazani valley, Tsinandali and Kindzmarauli and many indigenous grape varieties including Saperavi, Rkatsiteli, and Mtsvane.

Kartli
Kartli is known as a very rich region in terms of fruits (especially apples, apricots, figs, and peaches) and vegetables (especially cucumbers, tomatoes, and onions).
 Kartlian dishes include Puris Kharcho ( - a kind of soup made of bread), Shechamandi ( - soup made of dogwood or docks), Jonjoli ( - pickles made of Bladdernuts), Chakhrakina ( - a kind of Khachapuri filled with cheese and beetroot leaves), Khabizgina ( - Ossetian Khachapuri filled with cheese and potatoes), and Chakapuli ( - soup made of fresh herbs and meat of lamb or beef).

Lazeti
Though most of the historical part of Lazeti is located in Turkey, Lazes in Georgia, especially in Sarpi, still continue to carry their traditional dishes, some of them being :
 Bureği / Paponi: Baked sweet pastry filled with milk pudding.
 Gresta: Chicken or beef with melted cheese and mushrooms.
 Kapça Tağaney: Fried anchovies and vegetables.
 Kapça Princoni : Anchovy pilaf.
 Kapçoni Mç̌kudi: Fried cornbread with sliced anchovies, pkhali and herbs.
 Lu Dudey: Navy beans mixed with red Pkhali, onions and leeks.
 Lu Ncaxeyi: Sort of porridge made from different vegetables mostly cabbage, kidney beans, potato which are mixed with cornmeal.
 Muhlama: Cornmeal with cheese.

Samegrelo
The regional cuisine of Samegrelo can be considered the most famous in Georgia. It uses many spices and walnuts.
 Famous Megrelian dishes include Ghomi ( - porridge made of corn meal), Elarji ( - ghomi with Sulguni), Gebzhalia ( - rolls of cheese seasoned with mint), Megrelian Khachapuri ( - Khachapuri with cheese added on the top), Kupati ( - sausage made from pork organs and belly meat), Tabaka ( - chicken cooked with Ajika), and Kharcho ( - soup with beef).
 Sulguni is traditionally made in the region.
 Ajika is a sauce made of pepper and spices. It is made traditionally in Samegrelo and in Abkhazia.

Mtianeti, Khevi, Khevsureti, Pshavi and Tusheti
These cuisines are often considered as one due to their similarities.
Famous dishes include Khinkali ( - dumplings filled with meat, potatoes or cottage cheese), Gordila ( - boiled dough), Qaghi ( - dried and salted meat), Kaurma ( - a kind of soup made from meat), Kotori ( - Khachapuri filled with cottage cheese), Khachoerbo ( - dried cottage cheese in a ball shape) and Khavitsi ( - melted cheese)
Tusheti also produces a goat / sheep based cheese, called Guda.
 These regions are also well known for their beer and alcohol, Zhipitauri.

Racha-Lekhchumi
The cuisines of Racha and of Lechkhumi share most of their dishes and are often grouped into one cuisine as a consequence.
 Notable dishes include Shkmeruli ( - chicken in a sauce made of cream and garlic), Lori ( - pork bacon), Lobiani ( - a kind of Khachapuri filled with kidney beans and lori), Lobio ( - mashed kidney beans with spices), Rachuli Khachapuri ( - a kind of Khachapuri made into a square form).

Samtskhe-Javakheti
The Cuisine of Samtskhe-Javakheti consists of two regional cuisines: Meskhetian and Javakhetian. Due to their similarities, they are often considered one regional cuisine. This cuisine differs significantly from other regional cuisine of Georgia, partly because of its heavy use of goose meat and historical Turkish rule of the region.

 Famous dishes from Samtskhe-Javakheti include Batis Shechamandi ( - soup made of goose), Meskhuri Khinkali ( - Khinkali filled with goose), Apokhti ( - dried meat of lamb, beef, goose and duck), Tatarboragi ( - boiled dough), and Rdzis Korkoti ( - wheat grains boiled in milk).
 Snails or Lokokina are also a very common dish in the region due to the presence of French Catholics in the past.
 Samtskhe-Javakheti is also famous for its Chiri ( - dried fruits), Tklapi ( - fruit roll-up) and Tenili ( - a preserved, hand-pulled cheese).

Svaneti
 Main dishes from Svaneti include Kubdari ( - also known as Svan Khachapuri, a kind of Khachapuri filled with seasoned beef or pork), P'etvraal ( - Khachapuri filled with cheese and millet), Chvishtari ( - Mchadi with Sulguni inside), Lutspeq ( - boiled barley grains seasoned with pepper and garlic), Kharshil ( - soup of barley and urtica), Tashmijabi ( - mashed potatoes with Sulguni).
 Svaneti is also famous for its local alcohol made from fruits such as elderberry, and even honey.
 Svanetian salt, a spiced salt
 Agasyllis (Svanetian ღეჰი Ghehi  / (Georgian: დუცი  Dootsi ) is a local, Angelica-like plant with medicinal properties that is also eaten raw, cooked and pickled as a delicacy considered to benefit the digestion. It is also taken to combat parasitic worms and to treat respiratory complaints.

Appetizers

 Abkhazura: Caul fat rolled meatballs from Abkhazia.
 Achma: A dish with multiple layers of cheese and bread. It bears resemblance to a sauceless lasagna.
 Ajapsandali: A traditional Georgian meal. Consists of eggplants, potatoes, onions and spices.
 Badrijnis Khizilala: Fried and chopped eggplants. The name means "Eggplant Caviar".
 Jonjoli: Pickled flowers of bladdernut.
 Khachapuri: Cheese-bread with regional variation. This dish is very popular outside Georgia, especially in the ex-USSR.
 Kuchmachi: Dish made of chicken livers.
 Kupati: Fried sausage from Western Georgia.
 Kubdari: Meat-bread made from bread, meat, spices, and onions.
 Lobiani: Bean-stuffed Khachapuri.
 Lobio: Mashed beans with spices.
 Matsoni: Dairy product, similar to yogurt or sour cream.
 Mujuji: Pork jelly.
 Nadughi: Cream-like dairy product.
 Nigvziani badrijani: Fried eggplant and walnut sauce.
 Pkhali: Minced and chopped vegetables, mostly made of spinach, beets, and cabbage.
 Satsivi: Poultry in a special walnut sauce.

Breads
Traditional Georgian breads are varied, and include Tonis Puri, Shotis Puri, Mesxuri Puri, Nazuki and Mchadi.

Georgian breads are traditionally baked in a large, round, well-shaped oven called a tone.

Khachapuri

Khachapuri, also spelled as Hachapuri, is a traditional Georgian dish of cheese (fresh or aged, most commonly sulguni), eggs and other ingredients.

There are several distinctive types of khachapuri in Georgian food from different regions of Georgia:
Achma, from Abkhazia, which has multiple layers and looks more like a sauceless lasagna.
Adjarian (Adjaruli / Khachapuri, in which the dough is formed into an open boat shape and the hot pie is topped with a raw egg yolk and a pat of butter before serving.
Chakhrakina is a variation of Khachapuri made in Kartli and in Racha. It is filled with cheese and beets leaves.
Kotori is a Khachapuri made in Tusheti. The dough should be as thin as possible; and the filling consists of Kalti ( - a sort of cottage cheese made in the region) and erbo.
Gurian (Guruli / Khachapuri has boiled eggs inside the dough and looks like a calzone. Arguably, it is not a type of khachapuri. Gurians make them for Christmas and call them simply 'Christmas pie'. In the rest of Georgia, it is called 'Gurian pie'.
Imeretian (Imeruli / Khachapuri, which is circular and probably the most common type.
Lemzira is a Svanetian ritual cheese bread mostly made in a round or triangular shape.
Mingrelian Khachapuri also called "Megruli", similar to Imeretian but with more cheese added on top.
Meskhuri Khachapuri is a Khachapuri made of puff pastry dough and cheese. Lard is added in the dough and filling which give it a distinct taste from the more widespread Penovani Khachapuri. it is made in Meskheti.
Ossetian Khachapuri also called "Osuri" or by its original name "Khabizgina" is a version of Khachapuri which has potato, as well as cheese in its filling. 
Petvraali is a sort of Khachapuri filled with cheese and millet, made in Svaneti.
Penovani Khachapuri is made with puff pastry dough, resulting in a flaky variety of the pie. It is often sold as street food in local bakeries.
Pkhlovana or Mkhlovana is a Khachapuri made in the mountainous areas of Georgia, especially Khevi. It is similar to Chakhrakina but spinach is also added in the filling.
Rachuli Khachapuri also called “Bachuli” is a version of Khachapuri made in Racha. It is filled with cheese and is of rectangular shape and puff pastry dough is used.

Cheeses

 Adjaruli Chechili: Cheese made in Adjara from cow milk, which is shaped into ropes.
 Chogi: Cheese made from sheep milk in Tusheti.
 Chkinti': Salty and juicy cheese made originally in Imereti.
 Dambalkhacho: Moldy cheese made in Pshavi and Mtiuleti. It is considered one of the most ancient and expensive cheeses.
 Dampali Kveli: Rare cheese with a butter filling inside.
 Kartuli: Cheese made from a mixture of around 50% cow milk and a mixture of sheep, goat or buffalo milk.
 Guda: Cheese made from sheep milk in Tusheti. Its preparation lasts 20 days.
 Imeruli: Cheese made in the region of Imereti from cow milk.
 Kalti: Cheese made in mountainous regions of Georgia. It is often considered a shepherds' cheese because of its nutritional values.
 Kobi: Mixed cow/sheep milk cheese, mostly eaten in Eastern Georgia.
 Meskhuri Chechili: Cheese made in Meskheti and same as the Adjarian one.
 Narchvi: Cheese made in Svaneti. It is shaped in curds.
 Sulguni: One of the most famous cheeses in Georgia, which comes from Mingrelia. It is made from cow or buffalo milk. Outside Mingrelia, it is also made in Svaneti.
 Tenili: Cheese made in Samtskhe-Javakheti. It is shaped in curds.

Salads
 Kitri Pomidvris Salata: Cucumber and tomato salad with Georgian herbs, greens and Kakhetian oil. It is sometimes eaten with a walnut sauce.
 Ispanakhis Salata: Spinach salad.
Pkhali: Minced vegetables in a ball shape. It is mainly made from spinach, cabbage or beans and is topped with pomegranate seeds.
 Sagazapkhulo Salata: Salad made during Spring. There is not a strict recipe but it is mostly made of fresh ingredients and boiled eggs.
 Satatsuris Salata: Salad made of asparagus.
 Tcharkhlis Salata: Salad made of beets.

Soups and stews

Bozbashi: Soup made of mutton and peas and chestnuts, mostly consumed in Kakheti.
Chakapuli: Stew made of lamb or beef, tarragon and cherry plums in Eastern Georgia.
Chakhokhbili: Soup made of tomatoes and poultry meat which originated in Western Georgia.
Chikhirtma: Soup made of turkey or chicken meat and eggs which is traditionally made in Kakheti.
Kharcho: Soup made of beef, rice, cherry plums and walnuts from Mingrelia.
 Kharshil: Soup made of spinach in Svaneti.
Khashi: Boiled cow or sheep parts in their juice. Mostly made in the Eastern regions, especially Kakheti.
Lobio: Stew made mostly from kidney beans. Popular in Western Georgia.
 Matsvnis Supi: Soup made mainly of Matsoni.
 Puris Kharcho: Soup made of bread. It originated in Kartli.
 Shechamandi: Different sorts of soup made by a principle ingredients, mostly made in Kartli. These soups can be made of spinach, malva, garlic, dogwood, grains, sorrel, pink peavine and other ingredients.

Fish
Though Georgian cuisine is not very fish-oriented, there are still some dishes mainly made of trout, catfish and carp:
 Kalmakhi Tarkhunit: Fried trout with tarragon.
 Kalmakhis Kubdari: Kubdari filled with minced trout, onions, coriander and ajika.
 Kapchoni Mchkudi: Cornbread made with anchovy, which is made in Adjara by the Lazs.
 Kepali: Fried flathead mullet.
 Kibo Kindzit: Lobster cooked with coriander.
 Kibo Mokharshuli: Boiled lobster.
 Kibo Tetri Ghvinit: Lobster cooked in white wine.
 Kobri Nigvzit da Brotseulit: Fried carp with walnuts and pomegranates seeds.
 Loko Kindzmarshi: Boiled catfish with coriander and vinegar.
 Loko Tsiteli Ghvinit: Boiled catfish in red wine.
 Tsotskhali: Boiled or fried local fish.
 Tsvera Nigvzit da Brotseulit: Fried common barbel with walnuts and pomegranates seeds.
 Zutkhi Kaklis Potolshi: sturgeon cooked in a walnut leaf.

Meat

The most popular Georgian meat dishes include:

 Abkhazura: Fried meat, often offal, rolled in caul fat from Abkhazia.
 Apokhti: Dried / Smoked meat.
 Batis Shechamandi: Meskhetian soup made of goose meat.
Bozbashi: Soup of lamb meat with peas, chestnuts and tomatoes.
Chanakhi: Soup made of tomatoes and lamb.
Chakhokhbili: Soup made of tomatoes and poultry meat.
Chakapuli: Stew made of cherry plums, tarragon and meat from Kakheti.
Chashushuli: Spicy beef stew with tomato base
Chikhirtma: Soup made of chicken and eggs from Kakheti.
Gupta: Georgian version of Kefta meatballs.
Kharcho: Soup made of beef, tomatoes, herbs and walnuts.
Khash: Boiled parts of cow or sheep in its juice.
 Khashlama: Boiled meat.
Khinkali: Dumplings filled with beef, pork or lamb meat herbs from Eastern Georgia.
Kubdari: Khachapuri filled with meat from Svaneti.
Kuchmachi: Fried chicken livers with walnuts and pomegranate seeds.
Kupati : Fried sausage made of pork.
 Lori: Smoked pork from Racha.
Kababi: Meat cooked on fire, with pomegranate seeds.
Mtsvadi: Meat cooked on fire.
 Muzhuzhi: A kind of jelly filled with meat and vegetables.
 Qaghi: Smoked meat.
 Qaurma: A kind of soup with chopped meat.
Satsivi: Poultry meat in a walnut sauce called bazhe which originated in Western Georgia.
Shilaplavi: Pilaf made of lamb, spices, and vegetables.
Chkmeruli: Chicken in a cream-based sauce.
 Tabaka: Roasted chicken with Adjika.
 Tolma: Georgian version of Dolma. The filling is mostly meat and rolled in cabbage or grape leaf.
 Ziskhora: Svanetian boiled blood sausage

Sauces and spices
Sauces and spices common in Georgian cuisine include:
Adjika: Spicy paste or sauce seasoned with hot chili peppers.
Khmeli-suneli: Powdered herb/spice mixture.
Blue fenugreek: Milder than regular fenugreek.
Bazhe: Walnut sauce.
 Svanuri marili: Salt from Svaneti mixed with spices.
Tkemali: Cherry plum sauce.

Vegetarian dishes

Ajapsandali: Dish made of vegetables such as eggplant, potatoes, tomatoes, onions and herbs.
 Badrijnis borani: Chopped and fried eggplant with spices.
 Badrijnis khizilala ( - "eggplant caviar"): Chopped eggplant with pomegranate seeds and herbs.
 Badrijani mtsvanilit: Fried eggplant with fresh herbs (coriander, parsley and basil).
 Ekala nigvzit: Smilax with walnuts.
 Gogris gupta: Squash balls (vegetarian kefta).
Lobiani: Khachapuri filled with kidney beans.
Lobio: Mashed kidney beans with spices.
 Lobio nigvzit: Kidney beans with walnuts.
Pkhali: Minced vegetables with pomegranates.
Qnashi: Boiled minced pumpkin seeds which are later spiced and formed into a circle.
 Shechamandi: Soup, mostly made in Kartli of spinach, malva, garlic, dogwood, grains, sorrel, pink peavine, and other plant ingredients.

Desserts

 Akuakuar (Аквакуар): Honey biscuits made in Abkhazia
 Alaharuy or Alaharya ( / Алаҳария): Roll-ups traditionally made in Abkhazia from figs.
 Alvakhazi: Sweets of different shapes, made from honey and almonds in the region of Kakheti.
Chiri: Dried fruits mostly apricots, grapes, plums and figs.
Churchkhela: Candy made of grape juice mixed with flour and walnuts. It originated in Kakheti.
Janjukha: Same as Churchkhela but instead of walnuts, chopped hazelnuts are used. It is made in Guria.
Gozinaki: Candy made mostly for New Year. It is made from chopped walnuts and honey.
 Meskhuri Qada: A sort of bread filled with a mixture of lard and flour, traditionally made in Meskheti.
 Muraba: Sort of jam made mostly from fruits such as walnut, watermelon, quince, fig, berries and from flowers (especially wild rose).
 Nazuki: Sweet bread with cinnamon, lemon curds and raisins. It is made mostly in Shida Kartli, especially in Surami.
Pachkhi: Svanetian dessert made from a dried pear powder that is later mixed with water.
Palustaki: Dessert made from the combination of wheat flour, honey, erbo, similar to Halva.
Pelamushi: Dessert made of grape juice and flour, similar to a sweet porridge.
Pakhlava: Adjarian version of the Turkish dessert Baklava.
 Shaqarlama: Biscuits made from sugar and honey. It is made in Adjara.
 Taplis Kveri: Candy made from honey.
 Tklapi: Roll-ups made from fruits such as grapes, apricots, cherry plums, and figs.

Wine 

Georgia is the oldest wine-producing region in the world. The fertile valleys and protective slopes of the Transcaucasia were home to grapevine cultivation and neolithic wine production (ɣvino) for at least 8000 years. Due to the many millennia of wine in Georgian history and its prominent economic role, the traditions of wine are considered entwined with and inseparable from the national identity.

Among the best-known Georgian wine regions are Kakheti (further divided into the micro-regions of Telavi and Kvareli), Kartli, Imereti, Racha-Lechkhumi and Kvemo Svaneti, Adjara and Abkhazia.

UNESCO added the ancient traditional Georgian winemaking method using the Kvevri clay jars to the UNESCO Intangible Cultural Heritage Lists.

Alcoholic drinks from Georgia include chacha and wine (especially Georgian wine). Some of the most well-known Georgian wines include Pirosmani, Alazani, Akhasheni, Saperavi, and Kindzmarauli. Wine culture in Georgia dates back thousands of years, and many Georgian wines are made from traditional Georgian grape varieties that are little known in the West, such as Saperavi and Rkatsiteli. Georgian wine is well known throughout Eastern Europe, and is a significant national export, with exports of over 10 million bottles of wine per year. Georgia is also home to many beer brands, including Natakhtari, Kazbegi, Argo, Kasri, and Karva.

Lagidze water is a Georgian flavored soda drink, made with a variety of natural syrups, sold bottled or mixed directly in a glass from a soda fountain. Common types of mineral water from Georgia include Borjomi, Nabeghlavi, Likani, and Sairme.

See also
 Caucasian cuisine
 Ossetian cuisine
 European cuisine

References

External links

 Georgian Cuisine: Gastronomic Association of Georgia 
 Forbes Georgia: Georgia's Gastronomy Can Boost Country's Tourism
 Georgian Cuisine: 30 Traditional Foods to Try in Georgia
 Article of Forbes about Khachapuri
 Heritage site
 Shkmeruli Recipe
 Feast Like a Georgian; BBC

 

 
Caucasian cuisine
Masterpieces of the Oral and Intangible Heritage of Humanity
Georgian products with protected designation of origin